Is It You may refer to:

 "Is It You" (Cassie song)
 "Is It You" (Lee Ritenour song)